Pär Johan Petersson (born 29 March 1973) is a Swedish handball player who competed in the 1996 Summer Olympics and in the 2000 Summer Olympics.

He was born in Karlshamn.

In 1996, he was a member of the Swedish handball team won the silver medal in the Olympic tournament. He played two matches and scored 13 goals.

Four years later, he was part of the Swedish team which won the silver medal again. He played four matches and scored 16 goals.

External links
personal web page

1973 births
Living people
Swedish male handball players
Olympic handball players of Sweden
Handball players at the 1996 Summer Olympics
Handball players at the 2000 Summer Olympics
Olympic silver medalists for Sweden
Swedish expatriate sportspeople in Germany
Olympic medalists in handball
Medalists at the 2000 Summer Olympics
Medalists at the 1996 Summer Olympics
IFK Kristianstad players
People from Karlshamn
Sportspeople from Blekinge County
20th-century Swedish people